Purple Songs Can Fly is a non-profit organization that sponsors a music program at the Texas Children's Cancer Center in Houston, Texas. It allows patients at the hospital to compose and record songs in a real studio.

The program was founded in March 2006 by Anita Kruse, a songwriter and pianist. The Love Street Light Circus donated $10,000 to build a studio at the hospital. By December 2021, patients have recorded over 2800 songs.

According to David Poplack, "the arts have therapeutic value" and can improve the recovery of the patients.

In 2007, seven songs created through Purple Songs Can Fly were burned on purple CDs and were then played on Continental Airlines flights.

References

External links
 Official website

Arts organizations established in 2006
Music therapy
Non-profit organizations based in Texas
Organizations based in Houston
Texas Medical Center
2006 establishments in Texas